Pleasant View School, also known as Pleasantview High School is a public alternative high school in Milton-Freewater, Oregon, United States.

Academics
In 2008, 31% of the school's seniors received their high school diploma. Of 49 students, 15 graduated, 18 dropped out, and 16 are still in high school.

According to the Union-Bulletin, Pleasant View School will be closed due to costly repairs and loss of money.

References

Alternative schools in Oregon
High schools in Umatilla County, Oregon
Public middle schools in Oregon
Public high schools in Oregon